Medbourne railway station was a station in Medbourne, Leicestershire, on the Great Northern and London and North Western Joint Railway. It was between Hallaton junction to the north and Drayton junction to the south. Both junctions were connected to Welham Junction to the west.

History
The station was opened in 1883, four year after the Great Northern completed the double-tracked line between Leicester Belgrave Road and Peterborough North. In 1916, during the First World War, Medbourne station was closed to passengers as a war economy, although by this time the line had been reduced to single track. Shortly after the station closed, the building accidentally burned down. After the station was closed to passengers, the route became a goods line. The branch was closed in 1964.

The village of Medbourne was also served by Ashley and Weston railway station to the south on the London and North Western Railway. The station, which was known as Medbourne Bridge until 1879, closed  in 1952. The entire line was closed in 1964.

Summary of Former Services

Sample Train Timetable for April 1910
The table below shows the train departures from Medbourne on weekdays in April 1910.

References

Disused railway stations in Leicestershire
Railway stations in Great Britain opened in 1883
Railway stations in Great Britain closed in 1916
Former Great Northern Railway stations
Former London and North Western Railway stations